The following radio stations broadcast on AM frequency 1540 kHz: 1540 AM is a United States clear-channel frequency. KXEL Waterloo, Iowa, and ZNS-1 Nassau, Bahamas, share Class A status on 1540 AM.

Argentina
 LU 28 in General Madariaga, Buenos Aires
 LT 35 in Pergamino, Buenos Aires
 Lider in Martinez, Buenos Aires

Bahamas
Stations in bold are clear-channel stations.
 ZNS-1 in Nassau, Bahamas - 50 kW, transmitter located at

Canada
 CHIN in Toronto, Ontario - 50 kW daytime, 30 kW nighttime, transmitter located at

Mexico
 XESTN-AM in Monterrey, Nuevo León

United States
Stations in bold are clear-channel stations.

References

Lists of radio stations by frequency